Talkh Bakhsh (also Romanized as Qal‘eh Zavār and Talkheh Bakhsh) is a village in Kadkan Rural District, Kadkan District, Torbat-e Heydarieh County, Razavi Khorasan Province, Iran. At the 2006 census, its population was 1,108, in 248 families.

References 

Populated places in Torbat-e Heydarieh County